John Varvatos (born 1954) is an American menswear designer.

Early life
The Varvatos family is originally from the village of Poulata on the island of Kefalonia, Greece. Varvatos was born in Detroit and grew up in Allen Park, Michigan.

He attended Allen Park High School. At the age of 16, he got a job selling menswear at the Hughes & Hatcher store in nearby Dearborn.

He attended Eastern Michigan University and the University of Michigan.

Early career
After graduating in 1980, he co-founded a menswear store, Fitzgerald's Men's Store, in Grand Rapids, Michigan.

Varvatos joined Polo Ralph Lauren in 1983. He then moved on to Calvin Klein in 1990 where he was appointed head of menswear design and oversaw the launch of the men's collection and the cK brand. During his time at Calvin Klein, Varvatos pioneered a type of men's undergarment called boxer briefs, a hybrid of boxer shorts and briefs. Made famous by a series of 1992 print ads featuring Mark Wahlberg, they have been called "one of the greatest apparel revolutions of the century." Of their creation Varvatos said in 2010, "We just cut off a pair of long johns and thought, this could be cool ...".

In 1995, Varvatos returned to Ralph Lauren as head of menswear design for all Polo Ralph Lauren brands and created the Polo Jeans Company.

Career
In late 1999, Varvatos started his company, debuting his first clothing line at the end of 2000 in New York. The brand now includes belts, handbags, footwear, eyewear, watches and fragrances.

In September 2000, within months of showing his first collection, Varvatos opened a freestanding boutique in SoHo. The collection is currently distributed in John Varvatos boutiques including the 315 Bowery boutique in the space that formerly housed the underground music club CBGB.

2009 saw the launch of New York Nights…Direct From the Bowery, a monthly radio show hosted by Varvatos on Sirius XM's The Spectrum channel. The show includes songs and interviews from various artists who have influenced Varvatos throughout his career in fashion.

In 2012, Varvatos joined the cast of celebrity mentors on NBC's Fashion Star, a reality competition series that searched for the next big brand in fashion. In 2013, he saw the release of a limited edition Chrysler 300 in his name. In 2014, he partnered with Monte Lipman's Republic label to launch John Varvatos Records, initially signing the Zac Brown Band.

Varvatos credits his early obsession with rock 'n' roll as the catalyst for his interest in fashion. The ad campaigns for the main collection, shot by Danny Clinch, have featured such musicians and bands such as Iggy Pop, Alice Cooper, Velvet Revolver, Chris Cornell, Dave Matthews, The Roots, and Green Day.

John Varvatos filed for Chapter 11 bankruptcy in May of 2020. In 2021 Varvatos founded OTD.

Philanthropy
Music is also central to the brand's philanthropic efforts, including the Save the Music Foundation and an annual Stuart House benefit. In July 2014 it was announced that Ringo Starr would be modelling for the fall/winter advertising campaign, and that an associated charitable initiative would benefit The Ringo Starr Peace and Love Fund, in aid of the David Lynch Foundation. Commenting, Varvatos said, "Both inner peace and global peace are very important topics to me".

Partnership with Converse
In 2001, Varvatos and Converse formed a partnership and Varvatos was licensed to create a line of high end sneakers, John Varvatos' sneakers were usually produced in the style of High Top Chuck Taylor All-Stars.  The partnership has since ended, and Varvatos now produces a Bootleg brand show line in a similar Chuck Taylor style.

Awards
Varvatos had first received accolades from the Council of Fashion Designers of America (CFDA) in 2000 when he was honored with the Perry Ellis Award for Menswear. The following year he won the 2001 CFDA's Designer of the Year award.

In 2005, Varvatos received the CFDA's 2005 Menswear Designer of the Year award at the New York Public Library. The recipients are determined by a selection committee of top magazine editors, journalists, stylists and retailers from around the world.  He competed for the top honor along with Ralph Lauren and John Bartlett for his third CFDA win. In 2007, Varvatos was named GQs Designer of the Year.

References

External links

 
 
 Interview with John Varvatos on Adversus

1955 births
American fashion designers
American people of Greek descent
Living people
Artists from Detroit
Menswear designers
People from Allen Park, Michigan
University of Michigan alumni